The 2017–18 Swiss Super League (referred to as the Raiffeisen Super League for sponsoring reasons) was the 121st season of top-tier competitive football in Switzerland and the 15th under its current name and format. Basel were the defending champions. Young Boys won the title on 28 April 2018 after a 2–1 win against Luzern, with four games to spare. It was their first league title in 32 years, having last won the league in the 1985–1986 season, and their 12th league title overall. They also ended Basel's run of eight consecutive titles. 

A total of 10 teams competed in the league: the 9 best teams from the 2016–17 season and the 2016–17 Swiss Challenge League champion Zürich. The season started on the weekend of 22–23 July 2017 and ended on 19 May 2018 with a break between 17 December 2017 and 2 February 2018.

This season saw the introduction of changes in the way Swiss clubs may qualify for European competition; per new UEFA rules, the champions of the Swiss Super League now qualifies for the Champions League play-off round (previously directly to the Champions League group stage) and the runners-up now qualifies for the Champions League second qualifying round (previously to the third qualifying round). Qualification to Europa League spots for the third- and fourth-placed team remain unchanged.

Teams

Stadia and locations

Personnel and kits

Managerial changes

League table

Positions by round

Results

First and Second Round

Third and Fourth Round

Season statistics

Top goalscorers

1Ajeti played 7 games for St. Gallen then signed for Basel.
2Rapp played 18 games for Thun then signed for Lausanne.

}} Sorgic (Thun)
|}

Top assists